Melghat Assembly constituency is one of the 288 constituencies of Maharashtra Vidhan Sabha and one of the eight which are located in the Amravati district. It is reserved for Scheduled Tribe candidate.

It is a part of the Amravati (Lok Sabha constituency) along with five other Vidhan Sabha assembly constituencies, viz. Badnera Amravati, Teosa, Daryapur (SC), and Achalpur.

The remaining two Dhamangaon Railway and Morshi constituencies are part of Wardha (Lok Sabha constituency) in adjoining Wardha district.

As per orders of Delimitation of Parliamentary and Assembly constituencies Order, 2008, No. 41 Melghat Assembly constituency is composed of the following: 
1. Dharni Tehsil, 2. Chikhaldara Tehsil. 3.Achalpur Tehsil (Part), Revenue Circle –Paratwada and Pathrot of the district.

Members of Vidhan Sabha

^ by-poll

See also
Melghat
Dharni, Amravati

Notes

Assembly constituencies of Maharashtra